Techtonic isn't an official word with an official spelling. You may be looking for one of the following terms.

Techtonic can refer to:

 Tecktonik, a frenetic and quirky form of street dance which is typically performed to electro house music.

Or, it may also be a misspelling of Tectonic, in reference to:
 Tectonics, a field of study within geology concerned generally with the structures within the lithosphere of the Earth or other planets.
 Plate tectonics, a scientific theory which describes the large scale motions of Earth's lithosphere.